VxWorks is a real-time operating system (or RTOS) developed as proprietary software by Wind River Systems, a subsidiary of Aptiv. First released in 1987, VxWorks is designed for use in embedded systems requiring real-time, deterministic performance and, in many cases, safety and security certification for industries such as aerospace, defense, medical devices, industrial equipment, robotics, energy, transportation, network infrastructure, automotive, and consumer electronics.

VxWorks supports AMD/Intel architecture, POWER architecture, ARM architectures and RISC-V. The RTOS can be used in multicore asymmetric multiprocessing (AMP), symmetric multiprocessing (SMP),  and mixed modes and multi-OS (via Type 1 hypervisor) designs on 32- and 64-bit processors.

VxWorks comes with the kernel, middleware, board support packages, Wind River Workbench development suite and complementary third-party software and hardware technologies. In its latest release, VxWorks 7, the RTOS has been re-engineered for modularity and upgradeability so the OS kernel is separate from middleware, applications and other packages. Scalability, security, safety, connectivity, and graphics have been improved to address Internet of Things (IoT) needs.

History
VxWorks started in the late 1980s as a set of enhancements to a simple RTOS called VRTX sold by Ready Systems (becoming a Mentor Graphics product in 1995). Wind River acquired rights to distribute VRTX and significantly enhanced it by adding, among other things, a file system and an integrated development environment. In 1987, anticipating the termination of its reseller contract by Ready Systems, Wind River developed its own kernel to replace VRTX within VxWorks.

Published in 2003 with a Wind River copyright, "Real-Time Concepts for Embedded Systems"
describes the development environment, runtime setting, and system call families of the RTOS.
Written by Wind River employees with a foreword by Jerry Fiddler, chairman, and co-founder of Wind River, the textbook is an excellent tutorial on the RTOS. (It does not, however, replace Wind River documentation as might be needed by practicing engineers.)

VxWorks key milestones are:

 1980s: VxWorks adds support for 32-bit processors.
 1990s: VxWorks 5 becomes the first RTOS with a networking stack.
 2000s: VxWorks 6 supports SMP and adds derivative industry-specific platforms.
 2010s: VxWorks adds support for 64-bit processing and introduces VxWorks 7 for IoT in 2016.
2020s: VxWorks continues to update and add support, including the ability to power the Mars 2020 lander.

Platform overview
VxWorks supports Intel architecture, Power architecture, and ARM architectures. The RTOS can be used in multi-core asymmetric multiprocessing (AMP), symmetric multiprocessing (SMP), mixed modes and multi-OS (via Type 1 hypervisor) designs on 32- and 64- bit processors.

The VxWorks consists of a set of runtime components and development tools. The run time components are an operating system (UP and SMP; 32- and 64-bit), software for applications support (file system, core network stack, USB stack, and inter-process communications), and hardware support (architecture adapter, processor support library, device driver library, and board support packages). VxWorks core development tools are compilers such as Diab, GNU, and Intel C++ Compiler (ICC)) and its build and configuration tools. The system also includes productivity tools such as its Workbench development suite and Intel tools and development support tools for asset tracking and host support.

The platform is a modular, vendor-neutral, open system that supports a range of third-party software and hardware. The OS kernel is separate from middleware, applications, and other packages, which enables easier bug fixes and testing of new features. An implementation of a layered source build system allows multiple versions of any stack to be installed at the same time so developers can select which version of any feature set should go into the VxWorks kernel libraries.

Optional advanced technology for VxWorks provides add-on technology-related capabilities, such as:
 Advanced security features to safeguard devices and data residing in and traveling across the Internet of Things (IoT)
 Advanced safety partitioning to enable reliable application consolidation
 Real-time advanced visual edge analytics allow autonomous responses on VxWorks-based devices in real-time without latency
 Optimized embedded Java runtime engine enabling the deployment of Java applications
 Virtualization capability with a real-time embedded, Type 1 hypervisor

Features

A list of some of the features of the OS are:

 Multitasking kernel with preemptive and round-robin scheduling and fast interrupt response
 Native 64-bit operating system (only one 64-bit architecture supported: x86-64). Data model: LP64
 User-mode applications ("Real-Time Processes", or RTP) isolated from other user-mode applications as well as the kernel via memory protection mechanisms
 SMP, AMP and mixed mode multiprocessing support
 Error handling framework
 Bluetooth, USB, CAN protocols, Firewire IEEE 1394, BLE, L2CAP, Continua stack, health device profile
 Binary, counting, and mutual exclusion semaphores with priority inheritance
 Local and distributed message queues
 POSIX PSE52 certified conformity in user-mode execution environment 
 File systems: High Reliability File System (HRFS), FAT-based file system (DOSFS), Network File System (NFS), and TFFS
 Dual-mode IPv6 networking stack with IPv6 Ready Logo certification
 Memory protection including real-time processes (RTPs), error detection and reporting, and IPC
 Multi-OS messaging using TIPC and Wind River multi-OS IPC
 Symbolic debugging

In March 2014, Wind River introduced VxWorks 7, which emphasizes scalability, security, safety, connectivity, graphics, and virtualization. The following lists some of the release 7 updates. More information can be found on the Wind Rivers VxWorks website.

 Modular, componentized architecture using a layered build system with the ability to update each layer of code independently
 VxWorks microkernel (a full RTOS that can be as small as 20 KB)
 Security features such as digitally-signed modules (X.509), encryption, password management, ability to add/delete users at runtime
 SHA-256 hashing algorithm as the default password hashing algorithm 
 Human machine interface with Vector Graphics, and Tilcon user interface (UI)
 Graphical user interface (GUI): OpenVG stack, Open GL, Tilcon UI, Frame Buffer Driver, EV Dev Interface
 Updated configuration interfaces for VxWorks Source Build VSB projects and VxWorks Image Projects
 Single authentication control used for Telnet, SSH, FTP, and rlogin daemons 
 Connectivity with Bluetooth and SocketCAN protocol stacks
 Inclusion of MIPC File System (MFS) and MIPC Network Device (MND) 
 Networking features with 64-bit support including Wind River MACsec, Wind River's implementation of IEEE 802.1A, Point-to-Point Protocol (PPP) over L2TP, PPP over virtual local area network (VLAN) and Diameter secure key storage 
 New Wind River Workbench 4 for VxWorks 7 integrated development environment with new system analysis tools
 Wind River Diab Compiler 5.9.4; Wind River GNU Compiler 4.8; Intel C++ Compiler 14 and Intel Integrated Performance Primitives (IPP) 8

Hardware support
VxWorks has been ported to a number of platforms and now runs on practically any modern CPU that is used in the embedded market. This includes the Intel x86 family (including the Intel Quark SoC), MIPS, PowerPC (and BAE RAD), Freescale ColdFire, Intel i960, SPARC, Fujitsu FR-V, SH-4 and the closely related family of ARM, StrongARM and xScale CPUs. VxWorks provides a standard board support package (BSP) interface between all its supported hardware and the OS. Wind River's BSP developer kit provides a common application programming interface (API) and a stable environment for real-time operating system development. VxWorks is supported by popular SSL/TLS libraries such as wolfSSL.

Development environment
As is common in embedded system development, cross-compiling is used with VxWorks.  Development is done on a "host" system where an integrated development environment (IDE), including the editor, compiler toolchain, debugger, and emulator can be used.  Software is then compiled to run on the "target" system.  This allows the developer to work with powerful development tools while targeting more limited hardware. VxWorks uses the following host environments and target hardware architectures:

Supported target architectures and processor families
VxWorks supports the following target architectures:

 ARM
 Intel architecture
 Power architecture
 RISC-V architecture

For the latest target architecture, processors and board support packages, refer to the VxWorks Marketplace: https://marketplace.windriver.com/index.php?bsp&on=locate&type=platform

The Eclipse-based Workbench IDE that comes with VxWorks is used to configure, analyze, optimize, and debug a VxWorks-based system under development. The Tornado IDE was used for VxWorks 5.x and was replaced by the Eclipse-based Workbench IDE for VxWorks 6.x. and later. Workbench is also the IDE for the Wind River Linux, On-Chip Debugging, and Wind River Diab Compiler product lines. VxWorks 7 uses Wind River Workbench 4 which updates to the Eclipse 4 base provides full third party plug-in support and usability improvements.

Wind River Simics is a standalone simulation tool compatible with VxWorks. It simulates the full target system (hardware and software) to create a shared platform for software development. Multiple developers can share a complete virtual system and its entire state, including execution history. Simics enables early and continuous system integration and faster prototyping by utilizing virtual prototypes instead of physical prototypes.

Notable uses

VxWorks is used by products across a wide range of market areas: aerospace and defense, automotive, industrial such as robots, consumer electronics, medical area and networking. Several notable products also use VxWorks as the onboard operating system.

Aerospace and defense
Spacecraft
 The Mars 2020 rover
 The Mars Reconnaissance Orbiter
 The Mars Science Laboratory, also known as the Curiosity rover
 NASA Mars rovers (Sojourner, Spirit, Opportunity) 

 The Deep Space Program Science Experiment (DSPSE) also known as Clementine (spacecraft) Clementine launched in 1994 running VxWorks 5.1 on a MIPS-based CPU responsible for the Star Tracker and image processing algorithms. The use of a commercial RTOS on board a spacecraft was considered experimental at the time

 Phoenix Mars lander
 The Deep Impact space probe
 The Mars Pathfinder mission

 NASA's Juno space probe sent to Jupiter
Aircraft
 AgustaWestland Project Zero 
 Northrop Grumman X-47B Unmanned Combat Air System
 Airbus A400M Airlifter
 BAE Systems Tornado Advanced Radar Display Information System (TARDIS) used in the Tornado GR4 aircraft for the U.K. Royal Air Force
 Lockheed Martin RQ-170 Sentinel UAV
 Boeing 787

Space telescopes
 Fermi Gamma-ray Space Telescope(FGST)

 James Webb Space Telescope

Others
 European Geostationary Navigation Overlay System (EGNOS)
 TacNet Tracker, Sandia National Laboratory’s rugged handheld communication device

 BAE Systems SCC500TM series of infrared camera cores
 Barco CDMS-3000 next generation control display and management system

Automotive
 Toshiba TMPV75 Series image recognition SoCs for advanced driver assistance systems (ADAS)
 Bosch Motor Sports race car telemetry system
 Hyundai Mobis IVI system
 Magneti Marelli's telemetry logger and GENIVI-compliant infotainment system
 BMW iDrive system after 2003
 Siemens VDO automotive navigation systems
 Most of Renault Trucks T, K and C trucks' electronic control units.
 European Volkswagen RNS 510 navigation systems

Consumer electronics
 Apple Airport Extreme
AMX NetLinx Controllers (NI-xx00/x00)
 Brother printers
 Drobo data storage robot
 Honda robot ASIMO
 Linksys WRT54G wireless routers (versions 5.0 and later)
 MacroSystem Casablanca-2 digital video editor (Avio, Kron, Prestige, Claro, Renommee, Solitaire)
 Motorola's DCT2500 interactive digital set-top box
 Mobile Technika MobbyTalk and MobbyTalk253 phones
 ReplayTV home digital video recorder

Industrial
Industrial robots
 ABB industrial robots
 The C5G robotic project by Comau
 KUKA industrial robots
 Stäubli industrial robots
 Yaskawa Electric Corporation's industrial robots
 Comau Robotics SMART5 industrial robot

Test and Measurement
 Teledyne LeCroy WaveRunner LT, WaveRunner2LT and WavePro 900 oscilloscope series
Hexagon Metrology GLOBAL Silver coordinate measuring machine (CMM)

Transportation
 FITSCO Automatic Train Protection (ATP)system 
 Bombardier HMI410 Train Information System

Controllers
 Bachmann M1 Controller System
 Invensys Foxboro PAC System
 National Instruments CompactRIO 901x, 902x 907x controllers
 Emerson distributed control system controllers
 AMX controls system devices
 The Experimental Physics and Industrial Control System (EPICS)
 Bosch Rexroth Industrial Tightening Control Systems 
 MCE iBox elevator controller

 Schneider Electric Industrial Controller
 B&R Automation Runtime
Storage systems
 External RAID controllers designed by the LSI Corporation/Engenio prior to 2011, now designed by NetApp. And used in RDAC class arrays as NetApp E/EF Series and OEM arrays

 Fujitsu ETERNUS DX Sx family of unified data storage arrays

Imaging

 Toshiba eBridge based range of photocopiers

Others

 GrandMA Full-Size and Light Console by MA Lighting

Medical
Varian Medical Systems Truebeam - a radiotherapy device for treating cancer 
 Olympus Corporation's surgical generator
 BD Biosciences FACSCount HIV/AIDS Monitoring System
 Fedegari Autoclavi S.p.A. Thema4 process controller
 Sirona Dental Systems: CEREC extraoral X-ray CAD/CAM systems
General Electric Healthcare: CT and MRI scanners
Carl Zeiss Meditec: Humphrey Field Analyzer HFA-II Series
Philips C-Arm Radiology Equipment

Networking and communication infrastructure
 Arkoon Network Security appliances 
 Ubee Interactive's AirWalk EdgePoint 
 Kontron's ACTA processor boards
 QQTechnologies's QQSG 
 A significant portion of Huawei's telecoms equipment uses VxWorks
 BroadLight’s GPON/PON products
 Shiron Satellite Communications’ InterSKY
 Sky Pilot's SkyGateway, SkyExtender and SkyControl
 EtherRaptor-1010 by Raptor Network Technology
 CPG-3000 and CPX-5000 routers from Siemens
 Nokia Solutions and Networks FlexiPacket series microwave engineering product
 Acme Packet Net-Net series of Session Border Controllers
Alcatel-Lucent IP Touch 40x8 IP Deskphones
Avaya ERS 8600
 Avaya IP400 Office
 Cisco CSS platform
 Cisco ONS platform
 Ciena Common Photonic Layer
 Dell PowerConnect switches that are 'powered by' Broadcom, except latest PCT8100 which runs on Linux platform
 Ericsson SmartEdge routers (SEOS 11 run NetBSD 3.0 and VxWorks for Broadcom BCM1480 version 5.5.1 kernel version 2.6)
 Hewlett Packard HP 9000 Superdome Guardian Service Processor
 Hirschmann EAGLE20 Industrial Firewall
 HughesNet/Direcway satellite internet modems
 Mitel Networks' MiVoice Business (formerly Mitel Communications Director (MCD)), 3300 ICP Media Gateways and SX-200 and SX-200 ICP
 Motorola Solutions MCD5000 IP Deskset System
 Motorola SB5100 cable modem
 Motorola Cable Headend Equipment including SEM, NC, OM and other lines
 Nortel CS1000 PBX (formerly Nortel Meridian 1 (Option 11C, Option 61C, Option 81C)
 Nortel Passport 
 Radware OnDemand Switches
 Samsung DCS and OfficeServ series PBX
 SonicWALL firewalls
 Thuraya SO-2510 satellite phone and ThurayaModule
 Radvision 3G communications equipment
 3com NBX phone systems
 Zhone Technologies access systems
 Oracle EAGLE STP system

TCP vulnerability and CVE patches 
As of July 2019, a paper published by Armis exposed 11 critical vulnerabilities, including remote code execution, denial of service, information leaks, and logical flaws impacting more than two billion devices using the VxWorks RTOS. The findings are significant since this system is in use by quite a few mission-critical products. This YouTube video from Armis shows how an attacker can tunnel into an internal network using the vulnerability and hack into printers, laptops, and any other connected devices. The vulnerability can bypass firewalls as well.

Information and patches for all VxWorks versions affected by Urgent/11 vulnerability can be obtained from Wind River.

As of December 2021 there are still some CVEs documented on the NIST database.

References

External links
 

ARM operating systems
Embedded operating systems
Intel software
MIPS operating systems
PowerPC operating systems
Real-time operating systems
Robot operating systems
X86 operating systems